Big Brother 2011, also known as Big Brother 12, was the twelfth series of the British reality television series Big Brother and the first not to be broadcast on Channel 4. It was broadcast on Channel 5 for the first time since the show's transfer from Channel 4. It launched on 9 September 2011 with an hour and a half-long special launch show, the day after the final of Celebrity Big Brother 8. It was hosted by Brian Dowling, the winner of Big Brother 2 and Ultimate Big Brother. The series ran for 64 days, ending on 11 November 2011 when the winner, Aaron Allard-Morgan, won half of the £100,000 prize fund, with the remainder split between the five finalists. The runner up was Jay McKray.

The series differed from the Channel 4 version in having the celebrity edition before the main series, with the latter running in the autumn rather than the traditional summer-long run. The series reverted to its traditional pattern a year later when Big Brother 13 aired in the summer of 2012. In 2018 the series reverted to the 2011 format again with Celebrity Big Brother 22 airing before Big Brother 19.

There were 14 original housemates, seven men and seven women all aged between 18 and 30. Much of the series concentrated on the romantic relationships that developed between the housemates during their time in the house.

The series was sponsored by skincare brand Freederm and was the first to use online voting via Facebook credits.

Production

History and build-up
After Richard Desmond bought Channel 5, he said he was keen to acquire Big Brother. Meanwhile, Endemol UK had been granted permission to keep the Big Brother House at the Elstree Studios, Hertfordshire, until 30 September 2013. On 6 April 2011, Channel 5 formally confirmed that they had signed a £200 million two-year contract with Endemol to screen Big Brother from 18 August 2011.

Auditions
On 3 May 2011, Endemol and Channel 5 officially opened the process for people to apply to be on the show. Open auditions for the Channel 5 series were held at Old Trafford in Greater Manchester on 10 and 11 June 2011. Auditions were also held in London on 18 and 19 June 2011 at the Emirates Stadium. All applicants had to attend the open auditions with identification to be considered for the series and had to be a legal resident of the UK or Ireland aged 18 or over by 31 July 2011 to audition for the show. Big Brother 2010 winner Josie Gibson took part in filming at the London auditions meeting potential housemates.

Trailers
From 23 July 2011, trailers announcing the imminent return of the celebrity version of the series were aired using Marcus Bentley's voice. Former housemates that featured in one of the trailers included Josie Gibson, Brian Dowling and Alex Reid. This coincided with the launch of the new eye logo for 2011.  In the run-up to Celebrity Big Brother, the channel featured a promotional campaign under the slogan "When Bruv takes over" based on the David Guetta and Kelly Rowland song "When Love Takes Over".  It featured a large cast of past housemates dancing and miming in the streets, finally meeting up in a park with CGI effects adding a fly-past with coloured smoke overhead. Break bumpers announcing the series were broadcast in the week running up to the launch along with a countdown to the launch day voiced by Bentley.  Channel 5 took out commercials on other channels, including ITV1 promoting the launch of the new series.  The launch was also trailed heavily in the printed media, including an advertising blitz in the Desmond-owned newspapers and magazines and posters in town centres.  In the second week of the celebrity version, trailers heralded the return of the main series on 9 September 2011.

Format
The format remained largely unchanged from previous seasons. The housemates are incarcerated in the Big Brother House with a strict rule of no contact with the outside world. Each week, the housemates take part in a major task that determines the size of the shopping budget, enables them to win luxuries and in some tasks, immunity from that week's eviction or power in the House. Nominations are normally carried out in the privacy of the diary room and are compulsory. Each housemate must nominate two of their fellow housemates to face the public vote and provide Big Brother with a justifiable reason for the nomination.  "Voting to save" has been used for the public vote as opposed to the "vote to evict" method generally used in previous series. On eviction night, the housemate with the fewest votes to save will be evicted. The last housemate remaining in the house will be the winner of the series.

The House
The main elements of the house design were inherited from those used for the previous celebrity series.  Viewers first previewed the new Big Brother house during Celebrity Big Brother 2011 in preparation for the intake of regular housemates on the night of 9 September 2011. Differences included the walls being changed from a fish theme to a forest theme, and the bedroom being made over with fresh textiles and gold mirrored furniture for the regular housemates.  In the bathroom, the installation of a transparent double shower cabinet with a frosted central band offered minimal privacy.  There was a clear view of the shower's unclothed occupant from the house and garden but the frosting obscured the user's private parts from a clear view.  There was a large central free-standing oval bath, with small pink and blue hand towels provided.  The bathroom was mainly blue and pink with a sofa and a clear view of the goings on from the living room and garden. Some of the house space was converted to create a luxury apartment for houseguest Pamela Anderson during her stay in the house earlier in the series. Following Anderson's departure, the luxury bedroom was used for a variety of tasks. The wall of faces in the living room was also changed on Day 3 with the new housemates' faces added.  These turn blue to indicate the nominated housemates and red to indicate an evicted housemate or to mark that a housemate has walked.

The Diary Room chair for this series was in the style of a luxury club chair in deep red with gold trim.  The new Diary room had already featured in Celebrity Big Brother 2011 along with a small task room adjacent.

The garden retained the oblong pool used in the previous Celebrity Big Brother series. In Week 1, an artificial beach area was installed ready for the arrival of Pamela Anderson. Later, this area featured in several outdoor tasks.  There are areas of astroturf and decking, palm trees and an outdoor shower. Three leather sofas stood in an outdoor lounge area next to the "beach". There were doors leading to the sauna cabin, toilet and the main house.  There was also an area of rattan seating with a selection of cushions, throws and garden lanterns. This area had an artificial fire hearth which lit up at night, with a decoration of logs and flames.

Eye logo
For the renewal of the show Channel 5 created a logo which was different from all of the previous Channel 4 logos. It was instead the Channel 4 eye inverted and mirrored to make it look more clean and simplistic. For series twelve the logo was as basic as ever. It had a grey shape surrounding the outside and had a pink inner circle further into the eye. This was followed by a grey/blue circle in the middle representing the pupil.

Title sequence
The main motif for the show's titles was a space-age-style, revolving 3D glowing eye. The titles were almost identical to that of Celebrity Big Brother and the housemates were included in the title sequences, showing various parts of their face/top part of body.

The Crypt
On Day 39, Big Brother revealed the presence of the Crypt, a secret burial place for nominated housemates Jay and Anton who became "ghosts" dead to the other housemates as part of the Week 6 shopping budget task. It was located near the main house, adjacent to the garden, and was decorated with Gothic-effect mouldings, gravestones, cobwebs, church candles and skeletons.  The room contained two tomb-styled beds.  From there, Jay and Anton could view and listen to their former housemates, eavesdropping on their conversations.  However, they had to remain silent during their stay to avoid detection by their fellow housemates.

Web presence and social media
Unlike most previous Channel 4 series, there was no 24-hour, free-to-air live feed from the house. The producers instead concentrated on the daily highlights shows, the spin-off and weekly eviction shows. They also placed daily preview clips from the action in the house on the dedicated website and YouTube page, with frequent updates on social media sites Twitter and Facebook.

Twists
During Week 6, on Day 39, a major nominations twist was introduced in the run-up to the film premiere of Paranormal Activity 3 which was to take place in the house later that week. Jay and Anton were nominated in the normal way but when the result of nominations was announced to the housemates they were told that they would be leaving the house immediately. However, they entered a secret area called the Crypt where they were told they were to be "dead" to the other housemates.  On the lightbox, their faces changed to red to indicate their "exit".  From the Crypt, Jay and Anton, dressed a ghouls, were able to watch the remaining housemates and performed a series of pranks on them.  They returned to the main house three days later following a seance in the crypt involving the other housemates. After revealing themselves in scary fashion, Anton and Jay had to nominate two other housemates for eviction, choosing Jem and Harry respectively to face the public vote.  On Day 46, in a further nominations twist, the housemates' friends and family openly made the weekly eviction nominations.  On Day 52, nominations took place on a Sunday, with housemates dressed up in Halloween costumes and sat in electric chairs in the garden. The housemates had to nominate face-to-face. Each nominated housemate received an electric shock delivered by Big Brother's assistant Igor.  On Day 57, it was revealed that one housemate (later revealed as Tom) would be evicted on the Thursday night prior to the Final.

On the eviction night of Day 57, Big Brother announced that the prize fund of £100,000 would be split as follows. The money was divided into two halves, with the overall winner receiving £50,000.  The other £50,000 was to be split unevenly between the five finalists at the end of the series in the following amounts: £30,000, £15,000, £4,000, £990 and £10 with the winner receiving £50,000 plus the bonus.  However, Big Brother told the housemates they must decide how to divide up the £50,000 themselves or lose it; however, viewers were told that this will not actually be the case.  On Day 58, the housemates drew lots to divide the money as follows: Alex, £30,000, Jay, £15,000, Louise, £4,000, Aaron, £990 and Tom, £10. As series winner, Aaron won a total prize of £50,990. The five recipients agreed to split the prize fund between each other equally once they leave the house.

Housemates

House guests

Pamela Anderson
On 8 September, the evening before the launch night, presenter Brian Dowling confirmed a "surprise guest" twist involving Canadian model and Baywatch star Pamela Anderson who would enter the house on launch night to host a party and set a number of tasks for the housemates during a four-day stay.

Ex-housemates
On Day 31, ex-housemate Rebeckah re-entered the house to host a date with Tom who won the rendezvous with her as part of the day's 'Let's get smashed' task.  She attempted to communicate with her former house "boyfriend" Aden who was listening outside the door with Anton.  However, this was against the task rules and she was admonished by Big Brother.  On Day 40, Tashie Jackson returned to the house to participate in the "Scream" shopping task, having previously returned covertly to do a bungee jump in Week 2.

Paranormal Activity 3 premiere night
On the night of Day 41, a number of ex-celebrity and main series housemates and other VIP guests re-entered the Big Brother house to preview the horror movie Paranormal Activity 3 at a special red carpet premiere showing of the film.  They joined current housemates Aaron, Jem, Louise and Tom who had won places at the event during an earlier task.  Guests attending the event included Celebrity Big Brother 8 winner Paddy Doherty and fellow housemates Bobby Sabel and Lucien Laviscount.  Also attending were former Big Brother UK housemates Nikki Grahame and Imogen Thomas, Hollyoaks actors Kieron Richardson and Bronagh Waugh, singer Michelle Heaton and reality show star and author Katie Price.

Kim Woodburn
In the penultimate week of the series, on Day 55, celebrity cleaning expert and former How Clean is Your House? presenter Kim Woodburn entered the house to inspect the state of domestic hygiene and to set a shopping task called It'll be all white to keep a pre-rewarded luxury budget of £300.  She berated the housemates for their messy ways and ordered them to clean up the house.  She also set them a shopping task to wear white outfits and keep them clean during a series of hazardous mini-tasks.  She promised to return at the end of the day to judge their efforts with the cleaning and the shopping tasks, with money deducted for soiling the outfits.  Having awarded a reduced shopping budget of £150, Woodburn awarded a bonus of £50 for the housemates' cleaning efforts.

Weekly summary

Nominations table

Notes

 : Pamela Anderson was able to give immunity to four housemates during her stay by giving them a Golden Swimsuit. Heaven, Aden and Maisy received the first three Golden Swimsuits, however the final Golden Housemate, Rebeckah, had to choose one of the other three and remove their privilege — she chose Aden, hence he was no longer immune from eviction.
 : Having won an endurance task on Day 9, Harry won immunity from that week's nominations. While he could not be nominated, he could still nominate.
 : Prior to nominating, the housemates were told by Big Brother that they could openly discuss nominations until further notice.
 : As a new Housemate, Jem could not nominate and could not be nominated by her fellow Housemates.
 : Anton and Jay received the most nominations but in a twist by Big Brother were "fake evicted" and moved to a secret room, "The Crypt", in which they could watch their fellow housemates on television screens. Anton and Jay had the power to decide which two housemates faced this week's eviction with them, provided they passed a secret mission. The two passed the secret mission and returned to the house. Anton chose Jem, and Jay chose Harry.
 : The housemates' friends and family nominated on their behalf. Aaron and Jem received the most nominations, however, Jem walked before the eviction had taken place, so Big Brother decided that any other housemate who received a nomination would also be up for eviction this week. Therefore, Aaron, Faye, Harry and Jay faced the public vote this week.
 : Housemates had to nominate face-to-face this week. Every time a housemate received a nomination they received an electric shock.
 : During the final week the public voted for who they wanted to win, rather than save. The Housemate with the fewest votes was evicted the day before the final. This Housemate was Tom, leaving Aaron, Alex, Jay and Louise in the final four.

Ratings
Weekly ratings for each show on Channel 5. Figures exclude Channel 5 +1. All numbers are in millions and provided by BARB.

After the relative success of Celebrity Big Brother 8, the main show struggled in the ratings for the majority of its run. The live final on 11 November closed the series with an all-time low of 2.2 million, around half the final viewing figures of Big Brother 11.

References

External links
 Official website
 

2011 British television seasons
12
Channel 5 (British TV channel) reality television shows
Television shows shot at Elstree Film Studios